Brotia herculea, common name the giant tower cap snail, is a species of freshwater snail with an operculum, an aquatic gastropod mollusc in the family Pachychilidae.

Description 
B. herculea has a taenioglossan radula. Its shell is large and turreted. The presence of axial ribs is highly variable.

Distribution 
This species occurs in Myanmar and Thailand.

Human use
It is a part of ornamental pet trade for freshwater aquaria. It is considered low-risk for invasiveness.

References

External links 

herculea
Gastropods described in 1846